Jiaolong or jiao (chiao, kiao) is a dragon in Chinese mythology, often defined as a "scaled dragon"; it is hornless according to certain scholars and said to be aquatic or river-dwelling. It may have referred to a species of crocodile.

A number of scholars point to non- southern origins for the legendary creature and ancient texts chronicle that the Yue people once tattooed their bodies to ward against these monsters.

In English translations, jiao has been variously rendered as "jiao-dragon", "crocodile", "flood dragon", "scaly dragon", or even "kraken".

Name
The jiao  character  combines the "insect radical" , to provide general sense of insects, reptiles or dragons, etc., and the right radical jiao  "cross; mix", etc. which supplies the phonetic element "jiao". The original  pictograph represented a person with crossed legs.

The Vietnamese equivalent is giao long,  considered synonymous to Vietnamese .

Synonyms 
The Piya dictionary (11th century) claims that its common name was maban.

The jiao is also claimed to be equivalent to Sanskrit   (modern Chinese pronunciation gongpiluo) in the 7th Century Buddhist dictionary Yiqiejing yinyi. The same Sanskrit equivalent is repeated in the widely used Bencao Gangmu or Compendium of Materia Medica. In Buddhist texts this word occurs as names of divine beings, and the Sanskrit term in question is actually kumbhīra.  As a common noun kumbhīra  means "crocodile".

Phonology
:308 reconstructs  Later Han Chinese kau and Old Chinese *krâu for modern jiao . Pulleyblank provides Early Middle Chinese kaɨw/kɛːw and Late Middle Chinese kjaːw (2011:150).

The form kău is used as the Tang period pronunciation by American sinologist Edward H. Schafer  (1967:32, 217–8, 345). The transliteration kiao lung was given by Dutch orientalist 's book on dragons (1913: 76–81).

Etymology

Jiao's etymology is obscure. Michael Carr, using Bernhard Karlgren's reconstruction of Old Chinese *kǒg , explains.
Most etymologies for jiao < *kǒg  are unsupported speculations upon meanings of its phonetic *kǒg  'cross; mix with; contact', e.g., the *kǒg  dragon can *kǒg  'join' its head and tail in order to capture prey, or moves in a *kǒg  'twisting' manner, or has *kǒg  'continuous' eyebrows. The only corroborated hypothesis takes *kǒg  'breed with' to mean *kǒg  indicates a dragon 'crossbreed; mixture'. (1990:126-7)

The word has "mermaid" as one possible gloss, and :308 suggests possible etymological connections with Burmese khruB or khyuB "scaly, furry beast" and Tibetan klu "nāga; water spirits", albeit the Tibeto-Burman are phonologically distant from OC.

Crossed eyebrows
The explanation that its name comes from eyebrows that "cross over" ( jiao) is given in the ancient text  "Records of Strange Things" (6th century) (:3508).

Early sense as mating dragons
It has been suggested that jiaolong might have referred to a pair of dragons mating, with their long bodies coiled around each other (Wen Yiduo 2001a:95–96)

Thus in the legend around the jiaolong  hovering above the mother giving birth to a future emperor i.e., Liu Bang, the founding emperor of Han, r. 202-195 BCE  (Sima Qian, Records of the Grand Historian), the alternative conjectural interpretation is that it was a pair of mating dragons.

The same legend occurs in nearly verbatim copy in the Book of Han, except that the dragons are given as  "crossed dragons". Wen noted that in early use jiaolong  "crossed dragons" was emblematic of the mythological creators Fuxi and Nüwa, who are represented as having a human's upper body and a dragon's tail (:18-19 apud :127).

Semantics
In textual usage, it may be ambiguous whether jiaolong  should be parsed as two kinds of dragons or one, as Prof.  (known in Japan as Chō Kyō) comments (2002:180).

Zhang cites as one example of jiaolong used in the poem Li Sao (in Chu Ci), in which the poet is instructed by supernatural beings to beckon the jialong and bid them build a bridge. Visser translated this as one type of dragon, the jiaolong or kiao-lung (1913: 77–78). However, it was the verdict of Wang Yi, an early commentator of this poem that these were two kinds, the smaller jiao and the larger long.

Translations
Since the Chinese word for the generic dragon is long, translating jiao as "dragon" is problematic as it would make it impossible to distinguish which of the two is being referred to. The term jiao has thus been translated as "flood dragon" or "scaly dragon", with some qualifier to indicate it as a subtype. But on this matter, Schafer has suggested using a name for various dragon-like beings such as "kraken" to stand for jiao:

The word "dragon" has already been appropriated to render the broader term lung. "Kraken" is good since it suggests a powerful oceanic monster. ... We might name the kău a "basilisk" or a "wyvern" or a "cockatrice." Or perhaps we should call it by the name of its close kin, the double-headed crocodile-jawed Indian makara, which, in ninth-century Java at least, took on some of the attributes of the rain-bringing lung of China. (1967:218)

Some translators have in fact adopted "kraken" as the translated term, as Schafer has suggested.

In some contexts, jiao has also been translated as "crocodile" (See §Identification as real fauna).

Attestations

Classification and life cycle 
The Shuowen Jiezi dictionary (121 CE)  glosses the jiao as "a type of dragon (long), as does the Piya dictionary (11th c.), which adds that the jiao are oviparous (hatch from eggs). The Bencao Gangmu states this also, but also notes this is generally true of most scaled creatures.

Jiao eggs are about the size of a jar of 1 or 2  capacity in Chinese volume measurement, according to Guo Pu's commentary; a variant text states that the hatchlings are of this size. It was considered that while the adult jiao lies in pools of water, their eggs hatched on dry land, more specifically on mounds of earth (Huainanzi).

The jiao did eventually metamorphose into a form built to fly, according to 's  ("Records of Strange Things"), which said that "a water snake (hui ) after 500 years transforms into a jiao; a jiao after a millennium into a dragon (long), a long after 500 years a horned dragon, a horned dragon after a millennium into a yinglong (a winged dragon)".

General descriptions 

The hujiao  or "tiger jiao" are described as creatures with a body like a fish and a tail like a snake, which made noise like mandarin ducks. Although this might be considered a subtype of the jiao dragon, a later commentator thought this referred to a type of fish (see #Sharks and rays section).

The foregoing account occurs in the early Chinese bestiary Shanhaijing "Classic of Mountains and Seas" (completed c. 206–9 BCE), in its first book "Classic of the Southern Mountains".

The bestiary's fifth book, "Classic of the Central Mountains" records the presence of jiao in the Kuang River ("River Grant") and Lun River ("River Ripple") . Guo Pu (d. 324)'s commentary to Part XI glosses jiao as "a type of [long ] dragon that resembles a four-legged snake" (: 378). Guo adds that the jiao possesses a "small head and a narrow neck with a white goiter" and that it is oviparous, and "large ones were more than ten arm spans in width and could swallow a person whole".

A description similar to this is found in the Piya dictionary, but instead of a white "goiter (ying)" being found on its neck, a homophone noun of a different meaning is described, rendered "white necklace" around its neck by Visser. Other sources concurs with the latter word meaning white "necklace" (or variously translated as white "tassels"), namely, the Bencao Gangmu quoting at length from Guangzhou Ji by Pei Yuan (317–420):

A later text described jiao "looks like a snake with a tiger head, is several fathoms long, lives in brooks and rivers, and bellows like a bull; when it sees a human being it traps him with its stinking saliva, then pulls him into the water and sucks his blood from his armpits". This description, in the Moke huixi   (11th century CE), was considered the "best definition" of a jiao by  Wolfram Eberhard (1968:378).

Scales
The description as "scaly" or "scaled dragon" is found in some medieval texts, and quoted in several near-modern references and dictionaries.

The Guangya (3rd century CE) defines jiaolong as "scaly dragon; scaled dragon", using the word lin  "scales". The paragraph, which goes on to list other types of dragons, was quoted in the Kangxi Dictionary compiled during the Manchurian Qing dynasty.

Aquatic nature
Several texts allude to the jiao being the lord of aquatic beings. The jiaolong is called the "god of the water animals" (Commentary to Guanzi; tr. :77). The Shuowen jieji dictionary (beginning of 2nd c.) states that if the number of fish in a pond reaches 3600, a jiao will come as their leader, and enable them to follow him and fly away". However, "if you place a fish trap in the water, the jiao will leave". A similar statement occurs in the farming almanac Qimin Yaoshu (6th c.) that quotes the Yangyu-jing "Classic on Raising Fish", a manual on pisciculture ascribed to Lord Tao Zhu (Fan Li). According to this Yangyu-jing version, when the fish count reaches 360, the jiao will lead them away, but this could be prevented by keeping bie  (variant character , "soft-shelled turtle").

Jiao and jiaolong were names for a legendary river dragon. Jiao  is sometimes translated as "flood dragon". The (c. 1105 CE) Yuhu qinghua  (Carr 1990:128) says people in the southern state of Wu called it fahong  "swell into a flood" because they believed flooding resulted when jiao hatched. The poem Qijian ("Seven Remonstrances") in the Chu Ci (tr. :255) uses the term shuijiao  " or water jiao.

Hornlessness 

The Shuowen Jiezi does not commit to whether the jiao  has or lacks a horn. However the definition was emended to "hornless dragon" by Duan Yucai in his 19th century edited version (: 76–77). (:368 )

Note the pronunciation similarity between jiao  and jiao  "horn", thus jiaolong  is "horned dragon".

Female gender
Lexicographers have noticed that according to some sources, the jiao was a dragoness, that is, a dragon of exclusively female gender (Carr 1990:126).

Jiao as female dragon occurs in the glossing of jiao  as "dragon mother" (perhaps "dragoness" or "she-dragon") in the (c. 649 CE) Buddhist dictionary Yiqiejing yinyi, and the gloss is purported to be a direct quote from Ge Hong (d. 343)'s Baopuzi . However, extant editions of the Baopuzi does not include this statement. The (11th century CE) Piya dictionary repeats this "female dragon" definition.

Records of hunt 
As aforementioned, jiao is fully capable of devouring humans, according to Guo Pu's commentary.

The war-general Zhou Chu (236–297) in his youth, who was native to this area, anecdotally slew this dragon: when Zhou spotted the man-eating beast he leaped down from the bridge and stabbed it several times; the stream was filled with blood and the beast finally washed up somewhere in Lake Tai where it finally died. This anecdote is also recounted in the Shishuo Xinyu (c. 430; "A New Account of Tales of the World") and selected in the Tang period primer .

Other early texts also mention the hunt or capture of the jiao. Emperor Wu of Han in Yuanfeng 5 or 106 BCE reportedly shot a jiao in the river (Hanshu; 6, Carr 1990:128; Dubs tr. 1954:94). The Shiyiji   (4th century CE) has a jiao story about Emperor Zhao of Han (r. 87-74 BCE). While fishing in the Wei River, he
..caught a white kiao, three chang [ten meters] long, which resembled a big snake, but had no scaly armour The Emperor said: 'This is not a lucky omen', and ordered the Ta kwan to make a condiment of it. Its flesh was purple, its bones were blue, and its taste was very savoury and pleasant. (tr. :79) 

Three classical texts (Liji 6, tr. Legge 1885:1:277, Huainanzi 5, and Lüshi Chunqiu 6) repeat a sentence about capturing water creatures at the end of summer;  "attack the jiao , take the to  "alligator", present the gui  "tortoise", and take the yuan  "soft-shell turtle"."

Dragon boat festival 

There is a legend surrounding the Dragon Boat Festival which purports to be the origin behind the offering of zongzi (leaf-wrapped rice cakes) to the drowned nobleman Qu Yuan during its observation. It is said that at the beginning of the Eastern Han Dynasty (25 A. D.), a man from Changsha named Ou Hui had a vision in a dream of Qu Yuan instructing him that the naked rice cakes being offered for him in the river are all being eaten by the dragons (jiaolong), and the cakes need to be wrapped in chinaberry (Melia) leaves and tied with color strings, which are two things the dragons abhor.

Southern origins 

It has been suggested that the jiao is not a creature of  origin, but something introduced from the Far South or  culture (:106–107 and : endnote 34), which encompasses the people of the ancient Yue  state), as well as the Hundred Yue people.

Eberhard  concludes (1968:378-9) that the jiao, which "occur in the whole of Central and South China", "is a special form of the snake as river god. The snake as river god or god of the ocean is typical for the coastal culture, particularly the sub-group of the Tan peoples (the Tanka people)". :26 also suggests, "The Chinese lore about these southern krakens seems to have been borrowed from the indigenes of the monsoon coast".

The onomastics surrounding the Long Biên District (now in Hanoi, Vietnam) is that it was so-named from a jialong "flood dragon" seen coiled in the river (Shui jing zhu or the Commentary on the Water Classic 37).

It is recorded that in southern China, there had been the custom of wearing tattoos to ward against the jiaolong. The people in Kuaiji  (old capital of Yue; present-day Shaoxing City) adopted such a custom during the Xia dynasty according to the Book of Wei (3rd c.). The Yue created this "apotropaic device" by incising their flesh and tattooing it with red and green pigments (Treatise on Geography in the Book of Han, 111CE, quoted by Kong Yingda).

Identification as real fauna 
The jiao seems to refer to "crocodiles", at least in later literature of the Tang and Song dynasties, and may have referred to "crocodiles" in early literature as well (:106–107 and : endnote 34).

Aside from this zoological identification, paleontological identifications have also been attempted.

Crocodile or alligator 
The term jiao e or "jiao crocodile" (Tang period pronunciation: kău ngak) occurs in the description of Han Yu's encounter with crocodiles according to 's  or "Records of the House of Proclamation" written in the late Tang period.

As noted the Compendium of Materia Medica identifies jiao with Sanskrit , i.e., kumbhīra which denotes a long-snouted crocodylid. The 19th century herpetologist Albert-Auguste Fauvel concurred, stating that jiaolong referred to a crocodile or gavial clade of animals (:8).

The Compendium also differentiates between jiaolong  and tuolong , Fauvel adding that tuolong should be distinguished as  "alligator" (:8).

Fossil creatures 
Fauvel noted that the jiao resembled the dinosaur genus Iguanodon, adding that fossil teeth were being peddled by Chinese medicine shops at the time(1879:8).

Sharks and rays 
In the foregoing example of the huijiao in the "Classic of the Southern Mountains" III, the 19th century sinologist treated this a type of dragon, the "tiger kiao" (:76), while a modern translator as "tiger-crocodile" (:8). However, there is also an 18-19th century opinion that this might have been a shark. A Qing dynasty period commentator,  suggested that huijiao should be identified as jiaocuo  ) described in the Bowuzhi  (:16; Shanhaijing jianshu), and this jiaocuo in turn is considered to be a type of shark.

As in the above example jiao  may be substituted for jiao  "shark" in some contexts.

The jiao  denotes larger sharks and rays (:368), the character for sharks (and rays) in general being sha , so-named ostensibly due to their skin being gritty and sand-like Compare the supposed quote from the Baopuzi, where it is stated that the jialong is said to have "pearls in the skin" . 

Schafer quotes a Song Dynasty description, "The kău (jiao) fish has the aspect of a round fan. Its mouth is square and is in its belly. There is a sting in its tail which is very poisonous and hurtful to men. Its skin can be made into sword grips", which may refer to a sting ray.(1967:221)

Derivative names

Usage
Jiaolong occurs in Chinese toponyms. For example, the highest waterfall in Taiwan is Jiaolong Dapu, "Flood Dragon Great Waterfall" in the Alishan National Scenic Area.

The deep-sea submersible built and tested in 2010 by the China Ship Scientific Research Center is named Jiaolong (Broad 2010:A1).

See also
 Mizuchi, Japanese dragon whose name is sometimes represented using the same Chinese character
 Jiaolong (album), an album by DJ Daphni (musician)

Explanatory notes

References
Citations
{{Reflist|30em|refs=

<ref name=chapin1940-p091>: "See the quotation from the  Kuang-ya in the K'ang-hsi: 'Those (dragons) that have scales are called  chiao-lung (i.e. jiaolong); those that have wings,  ying-lung; those that have horns,  ch'iu-lung; those that have no horns,  ch'ih-lung;  those that have not yet risen to Heaven,  p'an-lung".</ref>

}}Bibliography'''

 

 

 ; 2011 edition previewable via Google.

 Broad, William J., "China Explores a Frontier 2 Miles Deep", The New York Times, September 11, 2010. Retrieved 2010-09-12.

 ; selection (pp. 87–90)

 

 

 

 

 

  

 

 Legge, James, tr. 1885. The Li Ki, 2 vols. Oxford University Press.

 

 
 
 (Eng. tr.), 
 (Eng. tr.) 

. Aozora Bunko No.2536

 

 

 

 

 

 

 ,

 Watson, Burton, tr. 1968. The Complete works of Chuang Tzu''. Columbia University Press.

External links
 entry, Chinese Etymology
 entry page, 1716 CE Kangxi Dictionary
Flood Dragon Waterfall , Alishan National Scenic Area

Chinese dragons